Jérôme Commandeur (born 12 April 1976) is a French actor and director.

Filmography

Radio
 2014-2016 : Les pieds dans le plat on Europe 1

Television
 2017 : Host of the 42nd César Awards

External links

People from Argenteuil
1976 births
French people of Italian descent
French male film actors
Living people
21st-century French male actors